Haggerston School (previously Haggerston Girls' School) is a 900-place school in Weymouth Terrace in Haggerston, London Borough of Hackney, England. It is a Community School and from September 2010 became a co-educational school with its own sixth form. The school is also noteworthy as a Grade II listed building, built in 1964-65 by Ernő Goldfinger, the celebrated modernist architect.

Architecture
Haggerston School is the only English secondary school to be designed by internationally regarded architect, Ernő Goldfinger, who studied under Auguste Perret in Paris. Goldfinger's work is unique in Britain in that it combines the influences of Perret, one of the first architects to develop the use of concrete aesthetically, with detailing and forms derived from Le Corbusier. Goldfinger knew both architects personally. The elevations of the school follow the mathematical proportions of the Golden Section and it includes a double-height circulation spine with balcony.  The school is distinctive for the large amount of timber used in the construction and contains some of Goldfinger's boldest and most handsome public interiors including bush hammered concrete and coffered ceilings in the entrance and hall block.

On the same site is the School House (1964–65), and it shares a Grade II listing. The School House was designed by Ernő Goldfinger as an integral part of the school itself. The House illustrates Goldfinger's skill for adapting his interest in the use of tough materials, like dark brick and concrete, and refining them for use on a domestic scale with skilful use of proportions.

Notable alumni
Ivorian Doll
Patsy Palmer

References

Dept. of Culture press release 2003 accessed 6 Dec 2006
 Warburton, Nigel. Ernő Goldfinger: The Life of an Architect (Routledge, 2004) .

External links
Haggerston School website

Modernist architecture in London
Grade II listed buildings in the London Borough of Hackney
School buildings completed in 1965
Secondary schools in the London Borough of Hackney
Grade II listed educational buildings
Ernő Goldfinger buildings
Community schools in the London Borough of Hackney
Haggerston
1965 establishments in England